Rus' was one of the special forces (spetsnaz) units of the Ministry of Internal Affairs of the Russian Federation (MVD). Rus' belonged to the Independent Operative Purpose Division (ODON) rapid deployment division of the Internal Troops of Russia, the gendarmerie force of the MVD, and was assigned primarily to counter-terrorism duties.

Rus' was created on August 1, 1994, and traced its roots from the 4th Battalion of the Soviet OMSBON, the Independent Motorized Infantry Battalion of Special Purpose, later renamed ODON. The dedicated role of the Rus' unit was counter-terrorism and direct action in times of crisis, but actively participated in military and paramilitary operations in Chechnya and the broader North Caucasus region along with other MVD units, such as Vityaz. Rus' participated in numerous notable incidents in Russia, including in the Budyonnovsk hospital hostage crisis and the Kizlyar-Pervomayskoye hostage crisis.

On July 1, 2005, an entire platoon of Rus' commandos in Makhachkala, Dagestan, was eliminated by a roadside bombing attack while participating in the Guerrilla phase of the Second Chechen War.

On September 1, 2008, Rus' and Vityaz were formally deactivated and merged into a single unit, the 604th Special Purpose Center, under the direct command of ODON (formerly OMSDON). On 5 April 2016, the National Guard of Russia was established, resulting in the dissolution of the Interior Troops of Russia and the transfer of command of most armed forces under the MVD to the National Guard.

References

1994 establishments in Russia
2008 disestablishments in Russia
Defunct organizations based in Russia
Law enforcement in Russia
Non-military counterterrorist organizations
Non-military counterinsurgency organizations
Organizations based in Moscow
Special forces of Russia